Stuff Happens is a 2008 television show starring Bill Nye airing on Planet Green.  The show discusses how everyday activities can have a negative impact on the environment and encourages viewers to make choices that are less harmful to the environment.

Premise
In each episode, Bill Nye explains how our everyday activities affect the environment. Every episode focuses on a different aspect of life including breakfast, lunch, dinner, adult activities in the bedroom, and the office.

Cast and crew

International broadcast
The series premieres on 7 June 2015 in Australia on Discovery Science.

References

External links
 First Episode Guide
 

2008 American television series debuts
2000s American documentary television series
2010s American documentary television series
Destination America original programming